The Miss Rhode Island Teen USA competition is the pageant that selects the representative for the state of Rhode Island in the Miss Teen USA pageant and the name of the title held by that winner.

Rhode Island has placed six times at the Miss Teen USA Pageant, most recently in 2009 when Talia Turco made the top 15. The state's first finalist was Shaelyn McNally in 2006. One of those semi-finalists was Shanna Moakler, who would later win the Miss New York USA pageant and takeover the Miss USA title when Chelsi Smith won Miss Universe.

Other notable Miss Rhode Island Teen USAs are:
Claudia Jordan - was also Miss Rhode Island USA 1997 and has appeared on The Price Is Right, Deal or No Deal and The Real Housewives of Atlanta
Gina Tognoni - known for her portrayal of Kelly Cramer on the soap opera One Life to Live from 1995 to 2001.  Currently portraying the role of Phyllis Summers on the soap The Young and the Restless since August 11, 2014.  

Julia Potts of Richmond was crowned Miss Rhode Island Teen USA 2022 on May 29, 2022, at Veterans Memorial Auditorium in Providence. She will represent Rhode Island for the title of Miss Teen USA 2022 in October 2022.

Results summary

Placements
Top 10: Alysha Castonguay (2002), Shaelyn McNally (2006), Rochelle Rose (2007)
Top 12: Gina Tognoni (1991), Shanna Moakler (1992)
Top 15: Talia Turco (2009) 
 Rhode Island holds a record of 6 placements at the Miss Teen USA.

Awards
Miss Photogenic: Raye-Anne Johnson (1987 - tie), Gina Tognoni (1991)
Miss Congeniality: Malia Cruz (2016), Alexa Papigiotis (2017)

Winners 

1 Age at the time of the Miss Teen USA pageant

References

External links
 
 2016 Miss Rhode Island USA/Miss Rhode Island Teen USA Pageant
 Miss Rhode Island Teen USA Hall of Fame

Rhode Island
Women in Rhode Island
1983 establishments in Rhode Island